Archodontes is a genus of root-boring beetles in the family Cerambycidae. It is monotypic, being represented by the single species Archodontes melanopus. It is endemic to Central America and the south-eastern United States, and bores the roots of oaks and other hardwoods.

Description
Head short and black. Mandibles short. Antennae dark brown, almost black; shorter than the insect. The thorax broad, rough and black, margined on the posterior and anterior edges; having many small sharp spines on its sides, the two last of which are larger than the rest, and having two tubercles on the upper side. Elytra dark brown, almost black, margined on the sides and suture, with a small spine on each, at the extremities, and extending a little beyond the anus. Abdomen smooth and shining, and of a dark brown colour, nearly black. Sides of the breast hairy. Legs dark brown, almost black, smooth and shining, with three small tibial spurs. Length (including mandibles) 2¼ inches (57 mm).

References

Prioninae
Beetles described in 1767
Taxa named by Carl Linnaeus
Descriptions from Illustrations of Exotic Entomology